Dylan Nguene Bikey (born 18 February 1995) is a French footballer who plays as a striker or winger. He has previously played for Nantes, Dieppe, Stirling Albion, Heart of Midlothian, Doxa Katokopias and Drancy.

Career
In August 2013, Bikey signed a two-year contract with Nantes, after being the subject of interest from English club Everton.

On 25 November 2016, Scottish League Two club Stirling Albion signed Bikey on an amateur contract. During his time at the club, Bikey scored nine goals in nine games in all competitions.
 
On 27 January 2017, Bikey signed for Heart of Midlothian after leaving Stirling Albion a day prior. Bikey had been training at city rivals Hibernian ahead of a possible transfer. Hearts signed Bikey on amateur forms to avoid paying a compensation fee to Dieppe, one of his former clubs. After two months with Hearts, Bikey returned to Forthbank, joining Stirling Albion on loan until the end of the season. After just four months with Hearts, Bikey was released from the club at the end of his contract in May 2017.

After three months without a club, Bikey signed for Cypriot First Division side Doxa Katokopias in August 2017.

After spending time on loan at Drancy, Bikey signed for Stirling Albion for a third time in August 2019, agreeing a contract until the end of the 2019–20 season. On 11 January 2022, Bikey was released from his contract at Stirling Albion for personal reasons.

Personal life
Born in France, Bikey is of Cameroonian and Ivorian descent.

Career statistics

References

External links

1995 births
Living people
Footballers from Nantes
French footballers
French sportspeople of Cameroonian descent
French sportspeople of Ivorian descent
Association football forwards
FC Nantes players
FC Dieppe players
Stirling Albion F.C. players
Heart of Midlothian F.C. players
Doxa Katokopias FC players
JA Drancy players
Scottish Professional Football League players
Cypriot First Division players
French expatriate footballers
Expatriate footballers in Scotland
Expatriate footballers in Cyprus
French expatriate sportspeople in Scotland
French expatriate sportspeople in Cyprus